Edward Lucien Bobinski is a Canadian former diplomat. He was appointed concurrently as Ambassador Extraordinary and Plenipotentiary to Saudi Arabia, the Yemen Arab Republic and to the People's Republic of Yemen and later to Somalia then the Philippines.

After retirement Bobinski settled in Vancouver, British Columbia.  He became an avid golfer.

References

External links 
 Foreign Affairs and International Trade Canada Complete List of Posts

Year of birth missing (living people)
Living people
Place of birth missing (living people)
Ambassadors of Canada to Saudi Arabia
Ambassadors of Canada to North Yemen
Ambassadors of Canada to South Yemen
Ambassadors of Canada to Somalia
Ambassadors of Canada to the Philippines